Wilde Baridón (26 April 1941 – 29 November 1965) was a Uruguayan cyclist. He competed in the individual road race and team time trial events at the 1964 Summer Olympics.

References

External links
 

1941 births
1965 deaths
Uruguayan male cyclists
Olympic cyclists of Uruguay
Cyclists at the 1964 Summer Olympics
Place of birth missing
Pan American Games medalists in cycling
Pan American Games silver medalists for Uruguay
Cyclists at the 1963 Pan American Games
Medalists at the 1963 Pan American Games